The fifth season of Law & Order: Criminal Intent premiered on NBC on September 25, 2005, and ended on May 14, 2006.

This season featured the series's first two-part episode and "Cruise to Nowhere" was referenced later for an eighth season episode titled "All In".

This season of Law & Order: CI remained in its time slot of NBC Sunday's at 9PM/8c, its final season in this slot on NBC; its move to Tuesdays in the sixth season caused a ratings decline. During the 2005–2006 network TV season episodes were up against episodes of Desperate Housewives on ABC and episodes of Family Guy and American Dad! on Fox. The show "roller coasted" in the ratings with the competition, but NBC executives were impressed with the 11 million viewers per week it was able to retain.

Cast and crew changes
Veteran stars Vincent D'Onofrio, Kathryn Erbe, Jamey Sheridan, and Courtney B. Vance returned for the fifth season of Law & Order: CI. This season, long-time Law & Order franchise actor, Chris Noth reprises his role of Detective Mike Logan partnered with Annabella Sciorra as Detective Carolyn Barek, alternating episodes with D'Onofrio and Erbe (all four work together in the two-part episode "In The Wee Small Hours"). This stemmed from star Vincent D'Onofrio fainting twice from exhaustion, once on set and again at his home, during the fourth season.  

In February 2005 it was announced Noth would be joining the cast, reprising his Law & Order character after a ten-year absence. "The hardest job in show business is being a single lead on an hour drama series", creator and executive producer Dick Wolf explained. "Vincent has done an unbelievable job for the last four seasons, but after 3 years, the grueling pace finally took its toll. This is an ideal solution so that Vincent can continue to do the incredible work that has become the hallmark of the role. I've worked with Chris over the past 17 years, and bringing him on to reprise one of the most popular characters in the history of the brand, is a win-win situation." 

Executive producer and show runner at the time René Balcer added, "Having written for Chris during the five years he was on Law & Order, this is a unique opportunity for me to revisit an old friend and take Detective Mike Logan into uncharted territory. We like trying new things at Criminal Intent, whether it's asking our fans to decide a character's fate or using rotating leads. As Vincent said, cool counts, and we think this idea's pretty cool. Adding Chris and a new partner to the mix allows us to create a fresh dynamic while remaining true to what's made 'Criminal Intent' a success." 

Star Vincent D'Onofrio noted about the changes, "I love this show, and I hope to stay with it as long as it is on the air", D'Onofrio added. "After recently working with Chris on an episode, I am excited about what he will bring to the show creatively, and my reduced workload will be very welcome." Noth started, "It's great to be back working with Dick and Rene and to be in the Law & Order family again, I felt very much at home when I did the guest shot and realized how terrific the cast and crew are, it was an offer that I couldn't refuse." During an interview with TV Guide, Courtney B. Vance noted how grueling the episodes were for stars D'Onofrio and Erbe, because they were in just about every scene, with Noth and Sciorra joining the cast Vance says D'Onofrio and Erbe got a break, "Chris has a wonderful energy. He likes to have fun and joke around. He and Annabella love each other, too. The seamlessness of the transition [between the two sets of leads] speaks right to the genius of Dick Wolf." 

In May 2005, it was announced movie actress Annabella Sciorra would be joining the cast of L&O: CI as Detective Barek, partnered with Chris Noth's Detective Mike Logan. Dick Wolf commented, "Annabella is an extremely talented and versatile actress, who has that rare combination of beauty, sex appeal, power and humor. I also anticipate she will have terrific chemistry with Chris."

At the end of the season, Sciorra and Courtney B. Vance decided not to renew their contracts another season, in the sixth season, Sciorra was replaced by Julianne Nicholson who portrayed Detective Megan Wheeler; after this season, if an episode needed an assistant district attorney character, it would be portrayed by a guest star; in season 6 for two episodes each, Theresa Randle and Bridget Regan portrayed ADA's Patricia Kent and Claudia Shankly respectively. 

Jamey Sheridan announced he would be departing the cast of the show at the end of the season. Mostly because Sheridan's wife and children lived in Los Angeles at the time, he had to commute weekly to New York City to film episodes. Sheridan's character leaves the NYPD rather than face bogus charges set up by former Chief of Detectives Frank Adair (Michael Rispoli), whom Deakins refused to protect against charges of murdering a woman and her husband. In the sixth season, Sheridan was replaced by Eric Bogosian who played Captain Daniel Ross.

Co-creator and show runner René Balcer and executive producer Fred Berner departed the series at the end of the season; Balcer returned to the original Law & Order series with Burner for its eighteenth season, the episodes in the seventeenth season faltering. In the sixth season, Balcer was replaced by long-time Criminal Intent staffer, Warren Leight, Berner replaced by Norberto Barba.

Cast

Main cast
 Vincent D'Onofrio as Detective Robert Goren – alternating with Chris Noth (Episodes 1, 3, 5–7, 9, 11, 13, 15, 17, 19, 21)
 Kathryn Erbe as Detective Alexandra Eames – alternating with Annabella Sciorra (Episodes 1, 3, 5–7, 9, 11, 13, 15, 17, 19, 21)
 Chris Noth as Detective Mike Logan – alternating with Vincent D'Onofrio (Main credit episodes 2, 4, 6–8, 10, 12, 14, 16, 18, 20, 22, Recurring credit episode 1)
 Annabella Sciorra as Detective Carolyn Barek – alternating with Kathryn Erbe (Episodes 2, 4, 6–8, 10, 12, 14, 16, 18, 20, 22)
 Jamey Sheridan as Captain James Deakins
 Courtney B. Vance as ADA Ron Carver
note: for the first of only two times in the series (next in season 9), all the detectives work together in consecutive weeks, episodes 6 and 7 ("In The Wee Small Hours"), due to a particularly challenging case involving a judge.

Recurring cast
 Leslie Hendrix as Chief Medical Examiner Elizabeth Rodgers
 Robert C. Kirk as Chief of Detectives Yarrow
 Michael Rispoli as Former Chief of Detectives Frank Adiar

Guest stars
Notable guest stars in the fifth season of Law & Order: Criminal Intent include: 
 Chris Noth and Olivia d'Abo in the season premiere episode, "Grow". Noth returns to his role of Detective Mike Logan, who joins the Major Case Squad (leads Chris Noth and Vincent D'Onofrio would alternate episodes throughout the season.)  Olivia d'Abo returned in her recurring role of Goren's nemesis, Nicole Wallace; she helps the detectives close out the murder of a health inspector, who was the brother of Wallace's lover (Kevin J. O'Connor) at the time.
 Rebecca Wisocky guest starred in the episode "Diamond Dogs" as Dede McCann, a drug addict who manipulates her son Johnny (Peter Scanavino) into doing her bidding.
 Elizabeth Marvel portrayed the  kidnapped wife of a prison warden in the episode "Prisoner".
 David Keith portrayed a dirty cop named Mark Virgini, who was in league with mafiosi.
 Susan Misner portrayed Sister Olivia, a woman in a convent who knows something about a murdered nun. 

 Fred Dalton Thompson portrayed District Attorney Arthur Branch between 2002 and 2007; starring on the original Law & Order and both L&O and Law & Order: Trial by Jury in 2005. While he made many guest appearances on Law & Order: Special Victims Unit, he only appeared in Criminal Intent once, in the episode "In the Wee Small Hours". In that episode, Colm Meaney guest-starred as Harold Garrett, a corrupt trial judge whose entire family (Lucinda Jenney as his wife Elise, Matt O'Leary as his son Ethan) is on the hook for the murder of two young girls.
 Billy Lush returned to portray Conroy "Connie" Smith, the antagonist of the episode "Sound Bodies", in the first part of the two-part episode. This was the first episode that Geneva Carr began to portray television news reporter Faith Yancy, a recurring role she played until the ninth season. 
 Samantha Mathis guest starred in the episode "Saving Face" as Dr. Christine Ansel, a doctor involved with the murder of a medical student.
 In "Scared Crazy", Jennifer Van Dyck played a secretive therapist named Katrina Pynchon who manipulates her patient, Robbie Boatman (DJ Qualls), when a programmer at a hi-tech company is murdered. 
 In "Dollhouse", Heather Burns and Elizabeth Berkley portrayed two sisters who are involved in the murder of a car salesman.
 Malcolm McDowell guest-starred in the episode "Proud Flesh", in which he portrayed a powerful media magnate whose son is found murdered under bizarre circumstances.
 In the episode "Wasichu", David Alan Basche played the husband of a murdered secret service agent.
 Sherri Saum portrayed Lydia Wyatt in "The Healer", as a woman who performs voodoo rituals as part of an elaborate con.
 Lou Taylor Pucci guest-starred in the episode "Cruise to Nowhere", playing Joey Frost, a kid who gets wrapped up in the world of gambling and the murder of a cruise patron.
`Whoopi Goldberg guest starred in the episode "To the Bone" as Chesley Watkins, a woman whose former foster children rob and murder several rich people. Carolyn McCormick guest stars as Dr. Elizabeth Olivet, who helps Logan deal with his guilt after shooting an undercover cop, who incidentally is one of Watkins's former foster children.  Graham Patrick Martin, perhaps best known as Rusty Beck on Major Crimes, makes his first screen appearance, playing Benjamin Price, one of the foster kids. 
 Robert C. Kirk portrays Chief of Detectives Yarrow until the end of the season; he comes in after Logan shoots undercover Officer Tarkmen, and Captain Deakins (Jamey Sheridan) is accused of trying to promote Tarkmen to clear Logan.
 In the episode "On Fire", Michael Rispoli guest stars as Frank Adair, who is in Sing Sing prison to serve a life sentence after murdering two people. After Goren and Eames discover Deakins was set up by friends of Adair, Deakins confronts Adair about it. Adair denies any involvement.

Episodes

{| class="wikitable plainrowheaders" style="width:100%"
|- style="color:white"
! style="background:#baae43;"|No. inseries
! style="background:#baae43;"|No. inseason
! style="background:#baae43;"|Title
! style="background:#baae43;"|Directed by
! style="background:#baae43;"|Written by
! style="background:#baae43;"|Original air date
! style="background:#baae43;"|Productioncode
! style="background:#baae43;"|U.S. viewers(millions)

|}

References

 

Law & Order: Criminal Intent episodes
2005 American television seasons
2006 American television seasons